is a train station on the Kintetsu Keihanna Line in Ikoma, Nara Prefecture, Japan.

Line
Kintetsu Keihanna Line (Station Number: C28)

Layout
The station has two side platforms serving a track each between two tunnels.

History
March 27, 2006: Station begins services as the Keihanna Line extension between Ikoma and Gakken Nara-Tomigaoka opens.

Stations next to Shiraniwadai

	

Railway stations in Japan opened in 2006
Railway stations in Nara Prefecture
Stations of Kintetsu Railway